St Francis Anglo-Indian Girls High School is an all-girls Catholic private school for classes 1 to 10 in Coimbatore, Tamil Nadu, India, located on Trichy road in a 3-school complex with its sister schools, St.Joseph and St. Marys'.

History
The school was established in 1898 by the Franciscan Missionaries of Mary, a Franciscan order in India founded by Sister Helene de Chappotin, better known as Mother Mary Of The Passion.

The school had its centennial celebration in August 1998.

Houses
The school song written by Miss Samson is a testament to the attitude of courage and passion.
The school's symbolic colours are navy blue and white. The students are grouped into four houses, named after precious gems.
 Sapphire - Blue,
 Garnet - Pink, 
 Emerald - Green,
 Opal - White

Uniform
School uniforms for regular days consist of a navy blue pleated Pinafore, navy blue belt, black shoes, navy blue socks and a white collared shirt. The sports uniform worn two days a week comprises a pleated skirt in a colour of the house, white collared shirt, white socks and white sneakers.

Student life
Each classroom has almost 50-60 students - this small size classroom have allowed teachers to provide individual attention to student development. 
The school begins at 9:00 AM and ends at 3:50 PM with eight 40-minute classes each day. 
The school shows uncanny attention to all round development of the students, by focussing not just on academics, but various extra curricular such as sports, arts and drama.
It has a chapel where students can participate in choir, library, outdoor theatre stage, stationery store, canteen and multiple play grounds.
The school hosts occasional book sales from Scholastic book club, fetes hosted by teachers and students, regular cultural programs and inter and intra school competition on sports, debate, and other such areas.
The school also has a student council which consists of head girl or school pupil leader (SPL), asst. head girl or ASPL, 4 house prefects, a sports captain, a guides captain and a social league captain. The student council is elected by the students of classes 8, 9 and 10.

Alumni
Alumni of the school have gone forth in Indian Army, medicine, engineering and arts, studying in fine universities both in home country and around the world.

References

Franciscan high schools
Catholic secondary schools in India
Girls' schools in Tamil Nadu
Primary schools in Tamil Nadu
High schools and secondary schools in Tamil Nadu
Schools in Coimbatore
Educational institutions established in 1898
1898 establishments in India
Christian schools in Tamil Nadu